Red Nose Day 2013 is a fundraising event organised by Comic Relief. A number of run-up events took place and the main event consisted of a live telethon broadcast on BBC One and BBC Two from the evening of Friday 15 March 2013 to early the following morning.

Results

The sum for the 14th Red Nose Day includes:
£10,512,406 raised by Sainsbury’s, itself the biggest single donation ever received on the night of Red Nose Day.
The Through Hell and High Water challenge raised £1,196,000
Miranda Hart's Mad March raised £1,140,615 towards the total

Main event
The live telethon was broadcast on BBC One and BBC Two from the evening of Friday 15 March 2013 to early the following morning as well as a number of run-up events and was presented by Lenny Henry, Michael McIntyre, Davina McCall, Claudia Winkleman, Rob Brydon, Dermot O'Leary, John Bishop, Jonathan Ross, Jack Whitehall, David Tennant, David Walliams, Alan Carr and Russell Brand.

Presenters

Appeal Film Presenters
Stars including Davina McCall, Lenny Henry, Rob Brydon, Brenda Blethyn, Bill Nighy, Jonathan Ross and One Direction presented appeal films.

Official Single
One Direction recorded the official single "One Way Or Another (Teenage Kicks)".

Sketches and Features

Musical Performances

Music Videos

Within other shows
TV programmes that lead up to the main event included:
 The Great Comic Relief Bake Off
 Great British Menu for Comic Relief
 Let's Dance for Comic Relief
 Comic Relief Does Glee Club
 Comic Relief's Big Chat with Graham Norton
 Comic Relief: Through Hell and High Water
 Grimmy's Comic Relief Late Nighter

Before main event

Comic Relief's Big Chat with Graham Norton
On Thursday 7 March 2013 at 7:00pm GMT, Graham Norton began his challenge - To Host The Longest Chat Show Ever for Comic Relief. Whilst doing this Norton broke the Guinness World Record for 'The Most Questions Asked on a TV Chat Show'. In the process he raised £1,022,982 for Comic Relief. Guests for the evening included Sir Terry Wogan, Russell Tovey, Jimmy Carr, Martin Freeman, Keith Lemon, Ronnie Corbett and Warwick Davis.

Comic Relief does Glee Club

In March 2013, Comic Relief Does Glee Club returned to BBC One, which lets a group perform music in three varieties (choir, musical theatre and contemporary). This programme was presented by Sam Nixon, Mark Rhodes and Naomi Wilkinson.

Let's Dance for Comic Relief

 
The fifth series of Let's Dance for Comic Relief was broadcast between 16 February and 9 March 2013. It was won by Antony Cotton with Jodie Prenger in 2nd place.

Miranda's Mad March
Between 10 and 15 March, Miranda Hart was given a challenge, one week to complete five challenges, in five cities across England. The first day, Miranda attempted to break the Guinness World Record for the most armpits waxed in three minutes. The second day, Miranda took part in a Strictly Extravaganza, in which she attempted to dance ballroom with Strictly Come Dancing professional dancer Pasha Kovalev. The third day saw Miranda, singing with her new girlband 'Onesie Direction'. The fourth day saw Miranda take part in a dog show. The fifth and final day saw Miranda plan a wedding in one day. Miranda's Mad March raised £1,140,615 for Comic Relief.

Comic Relief: Through Hell and High Water
On Thursday 14 March 2013 at 20:00 GMT, BBC One aired a documentary called Comic Relief: Through Hell and High Water, the programme followed six celebrities as they took part in the Zambezi River challenge. Jack Dee, Dara Ó Briain, Melanie C, Chelsee Healey, Greg James and Phillips Idowu. The challenge was a bid to raise £1,000,000 for Comic Relief. The total which was announced on 15 March 2013, totalled to £1,196,000 from this challenge alone.

Grimmy's Comic Relief Late Nighter
Nick Grimshaw presented the final slot of the 2013 telethon in which he was joined by various celebrity guests.

Other events
A series of celebrities took part in Dares. These included Jessie J who had her hair shaved off for Comic Relief.

Donation progress
Sainsbury’s broke their own record from 2011 for the single biggest cheque that Comic Relief has received by raising £10,512,406.

References

Red Nose Day
2013 in British television
2013 in the United Kingdom
March 2013 events in the United Kingdom